The Women's slalom competition of the Calgary 1988 Olympics was held at Nakiska.

The defending world champion was Erika Hess of Switzerland, while Switzerland's Corinne Schmidhauser was the defending World Cup slalom champion and Switzerland's Vreni Schneider the leader of the 1988 World Cup.

Results

References 

Women's slalom
Alp
Oly